Kathleen Jessie Raine CBE (14 June 1908 – 6 July 2003) was a British poet, critic and scholar, writing in particular on William Blake, W. B. Yeats and Thomas Taylor. Known for her interest in various forms of spirituality, most prominently Platonism and Neoplatonism, she was a founding member of the Temenos Academy.

Life
Kathleen Raine was born in Ilford, Essex, the only child of schoolmaster and Methodist lay preacher George Raine, from Wingate, County Durham, and Jessie (née Wilkie), a Scot who spoke Scots as her first language. The Raines had met as students at Armstrong College in Newcastle upon Tyne. Raine spent part of World War I, 'a few short years', with her Aunty Peggy Black at the manse in Great Bavington, Northumberland. She commented, "I loved everything about it." For her it was an idyllic world and is the declared foundation of all her poetry. Raine always remembered Northumberland as Eden: "In Northumberland I knew myself in my own place; and I never 'adjusted' myself to any other or forgot what I had so briefly but clearly seen and understood and experienced." This period is described in the first book of her autobiography, Farewell Happy Fields (1973).

Raine noted that poetry was deeply ingrained in the daily lives of her maternal ancestors: "On my mother's side I inherited Scotland's songs and ballads…sung or recited by my mother, aunts and grandmothers, who had learnt it from their mothers and grandmothers… Poetry was the very essence of life." Raine heard and read the Bible daily at home and at school, coming to know much of it by heart. Her father was an English master at County High School in Ilford. He had studied the poetry of Wordsworth for his M.Litt. thesis and had a passion for Shakespeare and Raine saw many Shakespearean plays as a child. From her father she gained a love of etymology and the literary aspect of poetry, the counterpart to her immersion in the poetic oral traditions. She wrote that for her poetry was "not something invented but given…Brought up as I was in a household where poets were so regarded it naturally became my ambition to be a poet". She confided her ambition to her father who was sceptical of the plan. "To my father" she wrote "poets belonged to a higher world, to another plane; to say one wished to become a poet was to him something like saying one wished to write the fifth gospel". Her mother encouraged Raine's poetry from infancy.

Raine was educated at County High School, Ilford, and then read natural sciences, including botany and zoology, on an Exhibition at Girton College, Cambridge, receiving her master's degree in 1929. While in Cambridge she met Jacob Bronowski, William Empson, Humphrey Jennings and Malcolm Lowry. In later life she was a friend and colleague of the kabbalist author and teacher, Z'ev ben Shimon Halevi.

Raine married Hugh Sykes Davies in 1930. She left Davies for Charles Madge and they had two children together, but their marriage also broke up as a result of Charles' affair with Inez Pearn, at that time married to the poet Stephen Spender. She also held an unrequited passion for Gavin Maxwell. The title of Maxwell's most famous book Ring of Bright Water, subsequently made into a film of the same name starring Bill Travers and Virginia McKenna, was taken from a line in Raine's poem "The Marriage of Psyche". The relationship with Maxwell ended in 1956 when Raine lost his pet otter, Mijbil, indirectly causing the animal's death. Raine held herself responsible, not only for losing Mijbil but for a curse she had uttered shortly beforehand, frustrated by Maxwell's homosexuality: "Let Gavin suffer in this place as I am suffering now." Raine blamed herself thereafter for all Maxwell's misfortunes, beginning with Mijbil's death and ending with the cancer from which he died in 1969. From 1939 to 1941, Raine and her children shared a house at 49a Wordsworth Street in Penrith with Janet Adam Smith and Michael Roberts and later lived in Martindale. She was a friend of Winifred Nicholson.

Raine's two children were Anna Hopwell Madge (born 1934) and James Wolf Madge (1936–2006). In 1959, James married Jennifer Alliston, the daughter of Raine's friend, architect and town planner Jane Drew with architect James Alliston.

At the time of her death, following an accident, Raine lived in London. She died of pneumonia after being knocked over by a reversing car after having posted a letter.

Works
Her first book of poetry, Stone And Flower (1943), was published by Tambimuttu, and illustrated by Barbara Hepworth. In 1946 the collection, Living in Time, was released, followed by The Pythoness in 1949. Her Collected Poems (2000) drew from eleven previous volumes of poetry. Her classics include Who Are We? There were many subsequent prose and poetry works, including her scholarly masterwork, the two-volume Blake and Tradition (published in 1969, and derived from the Andrew Mellon Lectures she delivered at the National Gallery of Art in Washington D.C in 1968), which demonstrated the antiquity, coherence and integrity of William Blake's philosophy, refuting T S Eliot's assertion to the contrary (Collected Essays, 1932).

The story of her life is told in a three-volume autobiography notable for the author's attempts to impose a structure on her memories that is quasi mythical, thus relating her own life to a larger pattern. This reflects patterns in her poetry, influenced by W. B. Yeats. The three books were originally published separately and later brought together in a single volume, entitled Autobiographies (in conscious imitation of Yeats), edited by Lucien Jenkins.

Raine made translations of Honoré de Balzac's Cousine Bette (Cousin Bette, 1948) and Illusions perdues (Lost Illusions, 1951).

She was a frequent contributor to the quarterly journal, Studies in Comparative Religion, which dealt with religious symbolism and the Traditionalist perspective. With Keith Critchlow, Brian Keeble and Philip Sherrard she co-founded, in 1981, Temenos, a periodical, and later, in 1990, the Temenos Academy of Integral Studies, a teaching academy that stressed a multistranded universalist philosophy, and in support of her generally Platonist and Neoplatonist views on poetry and culture. She studied Thomas Taylor and published a selection of his works.

Raine was a research fellow at Girton College from 1955 to 1961. She taught at Harvard for at least one course about Myth and Literature offered to teachers and professors in the summer.  She also spoke on Yeats and Blake and other topics at the Yeats School in Sligo, Ireland in the summer of 1974. A professor at Cambridge and the author of a number of scholarly books, she was an expert on Coleridge, Blake, and Yeats.

The contemporary composer David Matthews has written a song-cycle, The Golden Kingdom, on some of Raine's poems. Richard Rodney Bennett's "Spells" (1974–75), a work for soprano, chorus, and large orchestra, is set to texts by Raine.

Honours
Raine received honorary doctorates from universities in the United Kingdom, France and the United States and won numerous awards and honors, including the Edna St. Vincent Millay Prize from the American Poetry Society (date unknown), and also:
 1952 Harriet Monroe Memorial Prize
 1953 Arts Council Award
 1961 Oscar Blumenthal Prize
 1970 Cholmondeley Award
 1972 Smith Literary Award
 1976 Warton Lecture on English Poetry
 1992 Queen's Gold Medal for Poetry
 2000 Order of the British Empire, Commander
 2000 L'Ordre des Arts et des Lettres, Commandeur

Bibliography

Poetry collections
 Stone and Flower, Nicholson and Watson, 1943
 Living in Time, Editions Poetry London, 1946
 The Pythoness, and other poems, H. Hamilton, 1949
 The Year One: Poems, H. Hamilton, 1952
 Collected poems, H. Hamilton, 1956
 The Hollow Hill: and other poems, 1960–1964, H. Hamilton, 1965
 Six Dreams, and other poems, Enitharmon, 1968
 Penguin Modern Poets 17 (David Gascoyne, W.S. Graham, Kathleen Raine), Penguin, 1970
 Lost Country, Dolmen Press, 1971
 On a Deserted Shore, Dolmen Press, 1973. En una desierta orilla Trad. de R. Martínez Nadal. M., Hiperión, 1981.
 The Oval Portrait, and other poems, Enitharmon Press, 1977
 The Oracle in the Heart, and other poems, 1975–1978, Dolmen Press/G. Allen & Unwin, 1980
 Collected poems, 1935–1980, Allen & Unwin, 1981
 The Presence: Poems, 1984–87, Golgonooza Press, 1987
 Selected Poems, Golgonooza Press, 1988
 Living with Mystery: Poems 1987-91, Golgonooza Press, 1992
 The Collected Poems of Kathleen Raine, Golgonooza Press, 2000 
 The Collected Poems of Kathleen Raine, Faber and Faber, 2019 (pbk.)

Prose 
 Defending Ancient Springs, 1967 
 Thomas Taylor the Platonist. Selected Writings, Raine, K.  and Harper, G.M., eds., Bollingen Series 88, London: Routledge & Kegan Paul, 1969 (also pub. Princeton University, USA)
 Blake and Tradition, 2 Volumes, Routledge & Kegan Paul, 1969
 William Blake, The World of Art Library - Artists, Arts Book Society, Thames and Hudson, London, 1970 (216 pp, 156 illustrations)
 Yeats, the Tarot and the Golden Dawn, Dolmen Press, 1973
 The Inner Journey of the Poet, Golgonooza Press, 1976
 Cecil Collins: Painter of Paradise, Golgonooza Press, 1979
 From Blake to a Vision, Dolmen Press, 1979
 Blake and the New Age, George Allen and Unwin, 1979
 Blake and Antiquity, Routledge & Kegan Paul, 1979 (an abbreviation of the 1969 Blake and Tradition; republished in 2002 by Routledge Classics with a new introduction by Raine)
 The Human Face of God: William Blake and the Book of Job, Thames and Hudson, 1982
 The Inner Journey of the Poet, and other papers, ed. Brian Keeble, Allen & Unwin, 1982
 Yeats the Initiate, George Allen & Unwin, 1987
 W.B. Yeats and the Learning of the Imagination, Golgonooza Press, 1999.
 Seeing God Everywhere: Essays on Nature and the Sacred, World Wisdom, 2004 (contributed essay)
 The Betrayal of Tradition: Essays on the Spiritual Crisis of Modernity, World Wisdom, 2005 (contributed essay)
 That Wondrous Pattern: Essays on Poetry and Poets, Counterpoint Press, 2017
 These Bright Shadows: The Poetry of Kathleen Raine, by Brian Keeble. A pioneering study of the poetic imagination of Kathleen Raine. (Angelico Press, 2020)

Autobiography
 Farewell Happy Fields, Hamilton/G. Braziller, 1974
 The Land Unknown, Hamilton/G. Braziller, 1975
 The Lion's Mouth, Hamilton/G. Braziller, 1977. autob.
 India Seen Afar, Green Books/G. Braziller, 1990
 Autobiographies, ed. Lucien Jenkins, Skoob Books, 1991

Biography
No End to Snowdrops, Philippa Bernard. Shepheard-Walwyn (Publishers) Ltd, 2009,

Adaptations
 Who stands at the door in the storm and rain from The Year One: Poems (1952) was set by composer Tarik O'Regan for unaccompanied chorus in 2006 with the title Threshold of Night; it was first recorded on the 2008 album of the same name.  
 A number of poems were also set by Geoffrey Bush; these settings were recorded by Benjamin Luxon for Chandos. 
 The song-cycle On a Deserted Shore by Joseph Phibbs was written and performed for the Temenos Academy in 2012 to texts by Kathleen Raine.
 A Spell For Creation was set by composer Mike Oldfield in the soundtrack for the documentary film The Space Movie.

See also
Temenos Academy Review

References

Further reading
Lighting a Candle: Kathleen Raine and Temenos, Temenos Academy Papers, no. 25, pub. Temenos Academy, 2008.

External links

Profile and poems, written and audio at the Poetry Archive 
Guide to the Kathleen Raine Papers. Special Collections and Archives, The UC Irvine Libraries, Irvine, California.
Guardian Unlimited obituary
Telegraph obituary
Temenos Academy
Profile of Raine at Temenos Academy

Kathleen Raine collection at University of Victoria, Special Collections
Lengthy interview of Raine by Naim Attallah
Kathleen Raine Papers at the British Library

1908 births
2003 deaths
Alumni of Girton College, Cambridge
Harvard University staff
English people of Scottish descent
English women poets
Commanders of the Order of the British Empire
Commandeurs of the Ordre des Arts et des Lettres
People from Ilford
William Blake scholars
20th-century English poets
20th-century English women writers
Writers from Essex
British literary critics
British women literary critics
W. B. Yeats scholars
Traditionalist School